Constantin Stan may refer to:

 Constantin Stan (sport shooter) (born 1959), Romanian sports shooter
 Constantin Stan (footballer) (born 1949), Romanian footballer
 Constantin Stan (rugby union)
 Constantin Stan (racewalker), Romanian racewalker and winner at the Balkan Athletics Championships